Denis Istomin was the defending champion but decided not to participate.
Uladzimir Ignatik won the final 6–3, 7–6(7–3) against Lukáš Lacko.

Seeds

Draw

Finals

Top half

Bottom half

References
 Main Draw
 Qualifying Draw

2012 ATP Challenger Tour
2012 Singles